In the extended complement of sibyls of the Gothic and Renaissance imagination, the Phrygian Sibyl was the priestess presiding over an Apollonian oracle at Phrygia, a historical kingdom in the west central part of the Anatolian highlands. She was popularly identified with Cassandra, prophetess daughter of Priam's in Homer's Iliad.

The Phrygian sibyl appears to be one of a triplicated sibyl, with the Hellespontine Sibyl and the Erythraean Sibyl and may be a doublet of the Hellespontine Sibyl.  There was indeed an oracular site in Phrygia, but a single one, at Gergitis.

The sibyls of Antiquity were increased to ten in Lactantius' Divine Institutions (i.6) a 4th-century work quoting from a lost work of Varro, (1st century BCE).

The word Sibyl comes (via Latin) from the ancient Greek word sibylla, meaning prophetess. There were several Sibyls in the ancient world, all of whom were re-employed in Christian mythology, to prefigure Christian eschatology:  

Such were the lines, based on Tuba mirum and composed by Aria Montano for the portrait of the "Phrygian Sibyl" (1575), one of the suite of ten copperplate engravings of the Sibyls by the Antwerp artist Philip Galle (1537–1612).

References

External links
Philip Galle's engravings of sibyls

Sibyls